Ancylolomia disparalis is a species of moth in the family Crambidae. It is found in France, Spain, Portugal, Italy, Greece, Turkey and North Africa (including Morocco and Algeria).

The wingspan is 27–43 mm. Adults are on wing from July to October in one generation per year.

The larvae feed on various grasses.

References

Moths described in 1825
Ancylolomia
Moths of Europe
Moths of Asia
Moths of Africa